Alfredo's Fire is a 2014 documentary film, directed by Andy Abrahams Wilson, about self-immolation victim Alfredo Ormando, who set fire to himself in January 1998 outside St. Peter's Basilica to protest the Catholic Church's condemnation of homosexuality. The film had its world premiere on February 2, 2014 at the Santa Barbara International Film Festival.

References

External links

Film's official website
John-Manuel Andriote, Huffington Post (March 15, 2013)

2014 films
Documentary films about suicide
Suicides by self-immolation
Documentary films about LGBT and Christianity
Religion and suicide
Documentary films about Catholicism
2014 LGBT-related films
2010s English-language films